Róbert Pich (born 12 November 1988) is a Slovak professional footballer who plays as a winger for Ekstraklasa club Legia Warsaw.

Club career

MŠK Žilina

In December 2010, Pich has signed three-and-a-half-year contract for Žilina to join them on 1 February 2011.

International career
Pich was called up to the senior Slovakia squad for a 2018 FIFA World Cup qualifier against England in September 2016.

Career statistics

Honours
Žilina
 Corgoň Liga: 2011-12
 Slovak Cup: 2012

References

External links
MŠK Žilina profile

1988 births
Living people
People from Svidník
Sportspeople from the Prešov Region
Slovak footballers
Slovakia under-21 international footballers
Slovak expatriate footballers
Association football forwards
SK Slavia Prague players
FK Železiarne Podbrezová players
Slovak Super Liga players
FK Dukla Banská Bystrica players
MŠK Žilina players
Śląsk Wrocław players
1. FC Kaiserslautern players
Legia Warsaw players
Ekstraklasa players
2. Bundesliga players
Expatriate footballers in Poland
Expatriate footballers in Germany
Slovak expatriate sportspeople in Poland
Slovak expatriate sportspeople in Germany